The Holm of Houton is one of the southern Orkney islands.

Geography
The Holm is in Midland Harbour, part of Scapa Flow. It is south of the Mainland parish of Orphir, near Houton whence its name.

The Holm is north of Cava and Rysa Little, and to the north east of Hoy over the Bring Deeps.

References 

Uninhabited islands of Orkney